Wishfart is a Canadian animated television series created by John Hazlett, Lienne Sawatsky and Daniel Williams. The series was produced by Wishfart Productions Inc. in association with Nelvana and Corus Entertainment, with Bejuba! Entertainment holding worldwide distribution rights. The series first aired in the United Kingdom on CITV on September 5, 2017, and later premiered in its home country of Canada on Teletoon on June 9, 2018. The series follows Dez, a teenage leprechaun with wish-granting powers, as he goes on escapades with a puffin named Puffin and a centuries-old teenage ghost girl named Akiko.

The series features the final voice acting role of Paul Soles before his death in 2021.

Characters

Main
 Dez (voiced by Mac Heywood): An awkward and reserved teenage leprechaun boy. He has the ability to grant wishes by firing a rainbow from his finger. However, wishes he grants always go wrong in some fashion, forcing him and his friends to fix it.
 Puffin (voiced by Sergio Di Zio): A talking puffin who shares Dez's apartment. Although he is greedy, lazy, and self-centered, he is a very supportive friend towards Dez, who had granted him the ability to speak with one of his wishes.
 Akiko (voiced by Stephany Seki): A mischievous and sarcastic yūrei who haunts Dez's apartment. She is an eternal teenager who died centuries ago from a plague that wiped out her whole village. She is nicknamed "Keeks" by her friends.

Recurring
 Tsuni (voiced by Jordan Todosey): A  laidback mermaid who rides on a skateboard and Dez's love interest. She has darker skin than Dez and has a collapsible trident in her backpack.  She works at a magical comic book store, where Dez and his friends hang out.                                                                                    
 Fireball Cat (voiced by Martin Roach): A mystical anthropomorphic cat named for the fire that burns on his head. He is the owner of a noodle soup restaurant frequented by Dez, his friends, and many other characters. He possesses near-omnipotent magical powers and knowledge, notably the ability to use his own mouth for scrying.
 The King of the Underworld (voiced by Brian Drummond): A giant angry demon who rules the Underworld. He is the occasional nemesis of Dez and his friends.
 Phil (voiced by Blair Williams): Dez's bitter, cynical, and greedy leprechaun uncle.
 Neptune (voiced by Christian Potenza): The God of the Sea, who behaves like an egotistical "surfer dude".
 Howie (voiced by Doug Hadders): A centaur who works in the postal service.
 Samuel (voiced by Doug Hadders): A yeti smothered in ice cream. He had wished for endless ice cream from Dez long ago, but soon came to regret the wish due to having to live with permanent brain freeze, sticky fingers, and lactose intolerance.
 Clooney (voiced by Craig Warnock): Dez's leprechaun dad.
 Emer (voiced by Kathy Laskey): Dez's leprechaun mom.
 Finnuala (voiced by Samantha Weinstein): Dez's nemesis. She is a leprechaun enforcer, working at her father's leprechaun reprogramming facility to ensure that all leprechauns are behaving as stereotypically expected of their kind.
 Leslie Walderamma (voiced by Darren Frost): An obnoxious wizard boy.
 Dusty (voiced by Evany Rosen): A witch who takes offense at people making assumptions about her.
 Gum King (voiced by Juan Chioran): Akiko's nemesis and self-proclaimed ruler of all gum. A humanoid creature composed entirely out of gum who came to be after another one of Dez's wishes backfired. When not antagonizing Akiko, he is an employee of De-Gum Chums, a business that specializes in removing gum.
 G (voiced by Jeff Lumby): A gargoyle who works as the security guard for Dez's apartment.
 Janice (voiced by Julie Lemieux): The two-faced Goddess of Thresholds. She is the doorperson of Dez's apartment.

Production
The series' title is a pun on the phrase "brain fart", applying the term instead to wishes. The series' creators came up with Wishfart during a lunchtime conversation when Dan Williams pitched an idea for a live-action series about a rich man in green who used his wealth to make people's wishes come true. The idea was soon developed into a children's animated series about a non-traditional leprechaun. The creators had little experience with animation, but managed to successfully pitch their idea directly to Teletoon without any sample artwork, thanks to the support of international distributor and producing partner, Tatiana Kober.

The first season was produced for $7.4 million US. Slap Happy Cartoons did the character designs, with the creators' aim being rounded shapes and thin outlines.

Episodes

Broadcast 
Wishfart premiered on CITV in the United Kingdom on September 5, 2017. It premiered on Discovery Italia (K2, in Italian) on November 6, 2017, on Cartoon Network Africa on January 1, 2018, and on RTBF (Belgium, in French) on February 10, 2018. It premiered on Teletoon on June 2, 2018, and on Télétoon (français) on May 27, 2018. It premiered on Cartoon Network UK on June 8, 2018. It premiered on Russia's Telekanal 2X2 on August 27, 2018. It started airing in Poland on TeleTOON+ on August 16, 2019, replacing Trollhunters. In Norway it is broadcast on NRK Super. It was expected to debut in France on Canal+ (in French), on Niki Kids in Ukraine, and on Australia's ABC in 2019. In the United States, it was released on Kidoodle.TV on December 9, 2021.

Reception
The series received five nominations at the 2019 Canadian Screen Awards in the categories of Best Direction (Animation), Best Sound (Animation), and Best Writing (Animation), with three of those nominations being in the last category. It was also nominated for an Award of Excellence for Best Program (Animation – Ages 9+) from the Youth Media Alliance in 2019, and won the Writers Guild of Canada's Screenwriting Award in the Children's category that same year.

References

External links

Television series by Nelvana
2010s Canadian animated television series
Teletoon original programming
2017 Canadian television series debuts
2018 Canadian television series endings
Canadian children's animated comedy television series
Canadian children's animated fantasy television series
English-language television shows
Leprechauns in popular culture
Teen animated television series
Animated television series about ghosts
Animated television series about birds